Christopher Wan Turner (born March 23, 1969) is an American former Major League Baseball (MLB) player who played for the California Angels, Kansas City Royals, Cleveland Indians, and New York Yankees between 1993 and 2000, and was a member of the Yankees' 2000 World Series championship team. He was primarily used as a backup catcher, but also played some first base, right field, left field, and saw time as a designated hitter.

Amateur career

A native of Bowling Green, Kentucky, Turner attended Western Kentucky University. In 1989 and 1990, he played collegiate summer baseball in the Cape Cod Baseball League for the Yarmouth-Dennis Red Sox.

Professional career

California Angels/Los Angeles Angels of Anaheim (1993–1997)
Drafted by the California Angels in the 7th round of the 1991 MLB amateur draft, Turner would make his Major League Baseball debut with them on August 27, 1993. He played in 25 games that year as a backup catcher and hit .280 with one home run and 13 runs batted in, his best season. In 1994, he played in a career-high 58 games and hit .242 with one home run and 12 runs batted in before the strike cancelled the remainder of the season in August. In 1995 he played in just five games, going 1-for-10 with an RBI. The next season, he played in four games, going 1 for 5 with an RBI and a walk. In 1997, he played in 13 games, going 6-for-23 with a homer and two runs batted in. On October 10, 1997, he was granted free agency. He signed with the Twins on December 5, 1997, but was released on April 20, 1998.

Kansas City Royals (1998)
Turner signed with the Royals on April 20, 1998, only hours after being released by the Twins. He played in four games for the Royals and went 0-for-9 with four strikeouts. He was granted free agency on October 15.

Cleveland Indians (1999)
Turner signed with the Indians on January 5, 1999. He played in just 12 games, going 4-for-21 with three runs, a steal, and a walk while recording eight strikeouts. On October 4, he was granted free agency.

New York Yankees (2000)
Turner signed with the Yankees on December 17, 1999, and was viewed as a temporary successor to Joe Girardi, who left as a free agent. He played in 37 games, his highest total since 1994 and the second highest of his career. Turner appeared in his final game on October 1, 2000, with the New York Yankees and received a World Series ring when the Yankees defeated the Mets in the Subway Series.

Retirement
Turner was granted free agency on November 21, 2000. On January 4, 2001, he signed with the Philadelphia Phillies but was released before the start of the season and subsequently retired.

References

External links

1969 births
Living people
American expatriate baseball players in Canada
Anaheim Angels players
Baseball players from Kentucky
Boise Hawks players
Buffalo Bisons (minor league) players
Cleveland Indians players
Columbus Clippers players
Kansas City Royals players
Lake Elsinore Storm players
Major League Baseball catchers
New York Yankees players
Omaha Royals players
Quad Cities River Bandits players
Sportspeople from Bowling Green, Kentucky
Vancouver Canadians players
Western Kentucky Hilltoppers baseball players
Yarmouth–Dennis Red Sox players